The African Youth Championship 1985 was contested through home and away matches. It also served as qualification for the 1985 FIFA World Youth Championship.

Teams
The following teams entered the tournament (and played at least one match):

Preliminary Round:
 
 
 
 
 
 
 
 

First Round:
 
 
 
 
 
 
 
 
 
Second Round:

Preliminary round
Burkina Faso, Libya and Togo withdrew, meaning Benin, Ethiopia and Senegal qualified for the First Round.

|}

First round
Benin and Senegal withdrew, meaning Guinea and Ivory Coast advanced to the second round. 

Entrants in this round were Algeria, Cameroon, Egypt, Ethiopia, Guinea, Ivory Coast, Morocco, Nigeria, Tunisia and Zimbabwe.

|}

Quarterfinals
Ivory Coast entered the tournament.

|}

Semifinals

|}

Final

|}

Qualification to World Youth Championship
The two best performing teams qualified for the 1985 FIFA World Youth Championship.

External links
Results by RSSSF

Africa U-20 Cup of Nations
Youth
1985 in youth association football